Eberechi Suzzette Wike (née Obuzor; born 24 May 1972) is a judge of the Rivers State High Court of Justice. She is married to current Governor Ezenwo Wike and is the First Lady of Rivers State since 29 May 2015.

Early life and education
Wike was born Eberechi Suzzette Obuzor in Odiokwu, Ahoada West of Rivers State. She comes from a Christian family consisting of Dr. and Mrs. Obuzor. She attended Rivers State University of Science and Technology, where she received her LL.B. (Hons.) in 1996.

Following her graduation, Wike successfully enrolled in Law School. She achieved the Barrister-at-Law degree (B.L.) in 1997. A year later, she was admitted to the Nigerian bar, eventually commencing practice in Port Harcourt, Rivers State.

Wike is a recipient of the Chevening Scholarship award (UK). she also holds a master's degree in law (LL.M.) from the University of Sussex.

Career
Wike joined Efe Chambers as Legal Counsel in charge of litigation. She was later selected to serve as Magistrate Grade I. While in the service, she rose to Chief Magistrate Grade II, and from there became High Court judge in February 2012.

She is a member of the International Bar Association, International Federation of Women Lawyers Rivers State Branch, National and International Association of Women Judges. Other memberships include Institute of Chartered Mediators and Conciliators, Chartered Institute of Arbitrators and former member of Magistrates’ Association of Nigeria Rivers State.

See also
List of people from Rivers State
Government of Rivers State
List of first ladies of Nigerian states

References

 

1972 births
Living people
Rivers State judges
Rivers State University alumni
People from Ahoada West
First Ladies and Gentlemen of Rivers State
Alumni of the University of Sussex
Lawyers from Port Harcourt
Nigerian women judges
Nigerian Christians
Eberechi
21st-century Nigerian women politicians
21st-century Nigerian politicians